Visitors to Artsakh must obtain a visa unless they come from one of the visa exempt countries.

Visa policy 
Citizens of the following countries, including those from the Commonwealth of Independent States and all Eurasian Union member states, can visit Artsakh without a visa:

In addition to the countries above, citizens of three other Post-Soviet disputed states can travel visa free to Artsakh. All members of the Community for Democracy and Rights of Nations have agreed to abolish visa requirements for their citizens:

Citizens of the following six countries are prohibited from entering the territory of the Republic of Artsakh:

Citizens of other countries can obtain a visa in the Permanent Mission of Artsakh to Armenia. In exceptional cases, the entrance visa can be granted at the Ministry of Foreign Affairs of the Republic of Artsakh in Stepanakert. There is a single 21-day tourist visa available, and single and multiple visas valid for up to one, two or three months.

Travellers with Artsakh visa (expired or valid) or evidence of travel to Artsakh (stamps) will be permanently denied entry to Azerbaijan.

Since 2021, a new procedure for entering the republic has been in effect. According to the amendments, all representatives of international media wishing to conduct journalistic activities in Artsakh must be accredited to both the Artsakh and Armenian Foreign Ministries.

See also

Foreign relations of Artsakh
Visa requirements for Artsakh citizens
Foreign relations of Armenia
Visa policy of Armenia
Visa policy of Transnistria
Visa policy of Abkhazia
Visa policy of South Ossetia

References

Nagorno-Karabakh
Foreign relations of the Republic of Artsakh